Government Polytechnic Lucknow  (राजकीय पालीटेक्निक लखनऊ) (founded 1892) is an institute of technical education of Uttar Pradesh in India. It is affiliated to Board of Technical Education Lucknow, Uttar Pradesh (BTEUP) and the All India Council for Technical Education (AICTE), New Delhi, India.

Government Polytechnic Lucknow located at Polytechnic Chauraha, Faizabad Road (Near Indira Nagar Metro Station). It is located about 12 km away from Lucknow Junction railway station. 

Established in 1892 as Industrial School for Railway Employees and was located at Basmandi Chauraha near Lucknow Junction railway station, Charbagh. In 1911 it was renamed as Government Technical Institute (GTI).  Again its name was changed as Government Polytechnic Lucknow (GPL) in 1961 and shifted to present location (well known as Polytechnic Chauraha).

Courses offered by the institute include architectural assistantship, Civil Engineering, Information Technology, Mechanical Engineering, Electrical Engineering and Electronics Engineering.

References

External links

Universities and colleges in Lucknow
1882 establishments in India
Technical universities and colleges in Uttar Pradesh